The BRP Melchora Aquino (MRRV-9702) is the second ship of her class of patrol vessels operated by the Philippine Coast Guard. The service officially classifies her as a multi-role response vessel (MRRV). At almost 97 meters long, she is one of the largest, and most modern vessels of the PCG. She was named after Melchora Aquino, a Filipino revolutionary during the Spanish colonial period.

Construction and design
The vessel was constructed by Mitsubishi Shipbuilding Co. Ltd in Shimonoseki, Japan based on the  Kunigami-class patrol vessels. The contract was under the "Maritime Safety Capability Improvement Project Phase 2" project of the Department of Transportation in 2016. The deal was worth 14.55 billion yen for two units from a JICA STEP Loan of 16.455 billion yen and was signed on February 7, 2020.

The vessel has a length of 96.6 meters, a maximum speed of not less than 24 knots, and has a complement of 67 officers and crew members. She is powered by two 6600 kW diesel engines. She has a helideck, and a hangar that can accommodate the H145T2 helicopter of the PCG. She also has a hyperbaric chamber for those who have diving sickness and a survivor room that can accommodate those who will be rescued.

The ship was launched on the 18th of November 2021, which was held by Mitsubishi Heavy Industries. Representatives from the  Philippine Coast Guard attended the short ceremony virtually.

History

The ship was officially accepted into service less than two weeks after arriving in the Philiplines. On Sunday, the 12th of June 2022, the Philippine Coast Guard held the commissioning ceremony at the South Harbor.

References 

Ships of the Philippine Coast Guard
Ships built by Mitsubishi Heavy Industries
2021 ships